Haemophilus virus HP1 is a virus of the family Myoviridae, in the genus Hpunavirus.

References 

Myoviridae